Pseudolepralia is a monotypic genus of bryozoans belonging to the monotypic family Pseudolepraliidae. The only species is Pseudolepralia ellisinae.

References

Cheilostomatida
Bryozoan genera
Monotypic bryozoan genera